Fridthjof Film is a Danish film production company founded by  in 2000.

History 
The company was founded by Ronnie Fridthjof in 2000. Its first productions were documentaries. Since 2008, it has also produced feature films.

Notable productions 
The company is internationally most notable for the award-winning documentary Armadillo. Its feature films have all been comedies featuring prominent Danish stand-up comedians among the cast members. The company has also produced the television series A-klassen, which was nominated for a Robert Award for best television series in 2013.

Filmography

Feature films 
 Blå mænd (2008)
 Julefrokosten (2009)
 Alle for én (2011)
 Alle for to (2013)
 Kolbøttefabrikken (2014)
 In War and Love (2018)

Documentary films 
 Armadillo (2010)
 Mercy Mercy (2012)
 Adoptionens Pris (2012)
 The War Show (2016)

References

External links 
 Official website
 

Film production companies of Denmark
Mass media companies of Denmark
Mass media companies based in Copenhagen
Danish companies established in 2000
Companies based in Copenhagen Municipality